Eve Myles (born 26 July 1978) is a Welsh actress. She is best known for her television roles portraying Ceri Lewis in the long-running BBC Wales drama series Belonging (2000–2009), Gwen Cooper in the BBC science-fiction series Torchwood (2006–2011) and Faith Howells in the bilingually produced BBC / S4C drama series Keeping Faith / Un Bore Mercher (2017–2020). She is also an accomplished theatre actress.

Myles graduated from the Royal Welsh College of Music & Drama in 2000. Later that year, she began playing Ceri Lewis in the BBC Wales-produced drama series Belonging, a role she was to continue with until the end of the series in 2009. Her early UK-wide television credits included the 2001 miniseries Tales from Pleasure Beach and the 2003 television drama Colditz.
In 2005, she auditioned for a part in the revived series of Doctor Who, and landed the role of servant girl Gwyneth, in the series 1 episode "The Unquiet Dead", alongside Billie Piper and Christopher Eccleston. Her appearance in Doctor Who led to her winning a lead role in the science-fiction drama's spin-off series Torchwood, in which she portrayed the character Gwen Cooper for four series between 2006 and 2011. Her role in Torchwood earned her a Bafta Cymru award for Best Actress in 2007.

Myles's subsequent television credits include the 2008 miniseries Little Dorrit, the 2008 premiere episode of the fantasy drama Merlin and the title role in the 2013 drama series Frankie.
In 2013, for the TV channel GOLD, she appeared alongside Anthony Head in the comedy-drama You, Me & Them, in a role she reprised in 2015 for the second series. In 2014, she was cast in the second series of the crime drama series Broadchurch, portraying Claire Ripley. In 2011, she voiced one of the main characters in the video game Dragon Age II. In 2016, she once again played a Victorian servant, this time Mrs. Jenkins in the ITV period drama series Victoria; she did not reprise the role for series 2.

Myles is a theatre actress, winning an Ian Charleson Award in 2004 for her performances in Royal Shakespeare Company productions of the plays Titus Andronicus and The Taming of the Shrew. Further theatre credits include both Henry IV, Part 1 and Henry IV, Part 2 at the National Theatre in 2004, and the role of Emma in the first UK run of Zach Braff's play All New People in 2012.

Early life
Myles was born on 26 July 1978 in Ystradgynlais. Her father is Scottish. She attended Ysgol Maes Y Dderwen, where she learned only basic Welsh phrases. She grew up with a strong interest in boxing, although she gave up the sport after breaking her knuckle by punching a wet sandbag. In 2000, Myles gained a Bachelor of Arts in acting at the Royal Welsh College of Music & Drama in Cardiff. Then she moved to London.

Career
In 2000 Myles took on the central role of Ceri Owen (née Lewis) in the BBC Wales drama Belonging. Her longest role to date, Myles played Ceri from the series' first episode through to its final series in 2008, returning for a one-off special in 2009. In 2001, Myles undertook a role in the television film Score and the TV miniseries Tales from Pleasure Beach. From 2003, Myles based herself in Stratford-upon-Avon, playing Lavinia in the Royal Shakespeare Company production of Titus Andronicus and Bianca in The Taming of The Shrew, for both of which she received the Sunday Times Ian Charleson award in 2004. In 2005, appeared opposite Michael Gambon in Henry IV, Part I and II at the National Theatre. She took the part of Gwenfar in the BBC Radio Four series of plays "Arthur" by Sebastian Baczkiewicz and Steve May in November 2004. Myles appeared in the ITV drama Colditz in 2005.

She took a supporting role in the Doctor Who episode "The Unquiet Dead", playing servant girl Gwyneth. This brought her to the attention of lead writer Russell T Davies, who went on to create and produce Torchwood. Considering her to be "one of Wales' best-kept secrets", Davies wrote the role of Gwen Cooper in Torchwood specifically for Myles. Speaking on her casting, Myles stated that having the part written for her was like having her "own personal Oscar." Gwen, an audience surrogate character, is characterised by Myles as Torchwood's "social worker", who "can run and fight and stand in her own corner and win." Her role in Torchwood also led to Myles making a second appearance in Doctor Who, for its Fourth series' finale, alongside Torchwood co-stars John Barrowman and Gareth David-Lloyd. Myles appeared in every episode of Torchwood.

Myles also appeared in the first episode of Merlin, "The Dragon's Call", where she played Lady Helen of Mora and Mary Collins, a witch who impersonated her. Her performance in this role was described positively by Anthony Head, who said that "she did it dead straight and very scarily. There was one moment she was delivering a speech to me in full prosthetic make-up... The French background artists didn't speak English but burst into applause at the end because they were moved by the emotion of it."

She portrayed the character of Maggy Plornish in Andrew Davies' 2008 adaptation of Little Dorrit, which later went on to win seven Emmy awards. Early 2008 also saw the actress host a radio show centred around Welsh boxer Joe Calzaghe and narrate a short story, Sorry for the Loss by Bridget Keehan, both airing on BBC Radio Wales.

2009 saw her star in the independent Welsh film A Bit of Tom Jones, as well as the one-off drama Framed for BBC Wales, alongside Trevor Eve. In July 2010, Myles announced she would appear in an original BBC Cymru Wales TV series, Baker Boys, co-written by Helen Raynor and Gary Owen and airing in early 2011. 2011 also saw Myles provide the voice of the Dalish elf Merrill in the Bioware video game Dragon Age II. In July 2011, to coincide with Torchwoods fourth series Myles presented part of a BBC Wales Documentary entitled Wales and Hollywood, which featured the actress travelling to the Hollywood Walk of Fame to find the Welsh talent honoured there.

In 2012 Myles returned to the stage in Zach Braff's play All New People, which ran for ten consecutive weeks at the West End's Duke of York's Theatre following runs at the Manchester Opera House (8–11 February 2012) and the King's Theatre in Glasgow (14–18 February). In 2013 she took the title role in the BBC1 drama Frankie, filmed in Bristol, which follows the life of a district nurse who cares more about her patients than her own life.

In August 2016, Myles alongside Jenna Coleman, Tom Hughes and Rufus Sewell in the ITV drama Victoria, which follows the early life of Queen Victoria from her ascension to the throne at the age of 18, through to her courtship and marriage to Prince Albert. She portrayed Mrs Jenkins, the Queen's personal dresser.

In 2017, Myles starred alongside her real life husband Bradley Freegard in the Welsh drama Un Bore Mercher for S4C. She learnt to speak Welsh for the role. Un Bore Mercher was also filmed in English and aired the following year on BBC One as Keeping Faith. Myles played Faith Howells, a solicitor whose husband Evan, with whom she works at their family-run law firm, disappears whilst she is on maternity leave following the birth of their third child. The show was a runaway success for the BBC and the second series was broadcast 2019 on S4C in May–June and on BBC One in July–August.

In 2018, Myles played the role of Norman Scott's lover Gwen Parry-Jones in the BBC drama A Very English Scandal. The drama relates the real-life story of politician Jeremy Thorpe's affair with Scott and subsequent trial for attempted murder, based on the novel of the same name by John Preston.

Awards and recognition
Myles was among many others nominated for Wales online Dafftas' best actress and won for her role as Frankie with almost 45% of the votes. Myles was nominated for and won Wales' sexiest woman in 2013.

Myles has been nominated for a total of six BAFTA Cymru awards, winning one. In 2002, 2003, and 2009, Myles was nominated for Best Actress in the BAFTA Cymru Awards for her role as Ceri on the BBC Wales drama Belonging.

In 2007, Myles won the BAFTA Cymru Best Actress award for her portrayal of Gwen Cooper in Torchwoods first series, a role she also received Best Actress BAFTA Cymru nominations for in 2008 and 2010. In 2010, Myles won the Best Actress award in the SFX Reader's awards poll, and was crowned best actress in the 11th annual Airlock Alpha Portal Awards. For her role as Gwen Cooper in Torchwood: Miracle Day, Myles was nominated for a Satellite Awards in the Best Television Actress category. and reached the shortlist for the 2012 UK National Television Awards.

In 2006, Wales on Sunday named Myles as its "Bachelorette of the Year". Myles also regularly ranks highly in the Western Mails annual list of the 50 sexiest women in Wales. In 2005, the Western Mail ranked Myles seventh whilst she ranked fifth in 2008, 7th in 2009, 8th in 2010 and 10th in 2011.

In June 2010, Myles was honoured with a fellowship from the Royal Welsh College of Music & Drama.

Personal life
Myles met Bradley Freegard at the National Youth Theatre in 1994, and they married in Italy on 18 May 2013. Myles and Freegard have three daughters, born in 2009, 2014, and 2021. After learning Welsh for Keeping Faith with the assistance of her husband, she now speaks conversational Welsh with her daughters.

Filming Torchwoods fourth series in 2011 saw Myles relocate with her family to America's Hollywood Hills, living "literally underneath the Hollywood sign". Myles has described California as the "land of dreams", and her experience filming the fourth series of Torchwood in Hollywood as the best year of her life, adding that she would love to spend more time there as an actress if possible.

Filmography

Film

Television

Radio and audio dramas

Stage

Audiobook narrator

Video games

References

External links

 
 
 
 Bio of Myles at BBC Wales

1978 births
Living people
20th-century Welsh actresses
21st-century Welsh actresses
People from Powys
Alumni of the Royal Welsh College of Music & Drama
Royal Shakespeare Company members
British Shakespearean actresses
Welsh voice actresses
Welsh radio actresses
Welsh stage actresses
Welsh television actresses
Welsh soap opera actresses
Welsh radio presenters
Welsh television presenters
Welsh film actresses
Welsh video game actresses
Welsh expatriates in the United States
Audiobook narrators
National Youth Theatre members
Welsh Shakespearean actors
Welsh-speaking actors
Welsh women radio presenters
Welsh people of Scottish descent